The Elka 22 was the second Bulgarian electronic calculator; it was  released in 1966 and its serial production began in 1967 in the town of Silistra.  Weighing 8.5 kilograms (18.7 pounds), the Elka 22 has 3 registers and operates with 12 decimal digits. Addition speed is 0.3 seconds per operation, and division speed is 0.5 seconds.  Its power consumption is 35 watts. This calculator has a plastic case, a nixie tube display and its technology is based on numerous phenol boards populated with hundreds of discrete transistors, diodes and resistors, not unlike other calculator models developed around the mid-1960s. The machine used a magnetic-core memory. It was widely used in Bulgaria and the other Eastern bloc countries until around 1980, long after its technology had become obsolete in the West around 1970.

References 

Electronic calculators by company
Goods manufactured in Bulgaria